Hampea micrantha is a species of flowering plant in the family Malvaceae. It is found only in Panama. It is threatened by habitat loss. The species occurs in rainforest up to 1,000 m.

References

 Hampea micrantha

micrantha
Endemic flora of Panama
Taxonomy articles created by Polbot